The ninth and final season of the American sitcom Everybody Loves Raymond aired from September 20, 2004 to May 16, 2005.

Cast

Main
Ray Romano as Raymond "Ray" Barone
Patricia Heaton as Debra (née Whelan) Barone
Brad Garrett as Robert Barone
Doris Roberts as Marie Barone
Peter Boyle as Francis "Frank" Barone
 Monica Horan as Amy McDougall/Barone
 Madylin Sweeten as Alexandra "Ally" Barone
Sawyer Sweeten and Sullivan Sweeten as Geoffrey Barone and Michael Barone

Recurring
 Georgia Engel as Pat MacDougall
 Fred Willard as Hank MacDougall
 Chris Elliott as Peter MacDougall
 Andy Kindler as Andy
 Jon Manfrellotti as Gianni 
 Tom McGowan as Bernie Gruenfelder
 Katherine Helmond as Lois Whelan 
 Robert Culp as Warren Whelan
 Amy Aquino as Peggy
 Albert Romano as Albert
 Alex Meneses as Stefania Fogagnolo
 Robert Joy as Mr. Putnam

Awards 
Rosenthal's speech for the season winning an Emmy for Best Comedy Series was placed on a 2012 Entertainment Weekly list of "17 Greatest Emmy TV Moments."

Episodes

References

2004 American television seasons
2005 American television seasons
Everybody Loves Raymond seasons